Selling the OC is an American reality television series created for Netflix by Adam DiVello. As a spin-off series of Selling Sunset, it revolves around the Oppenheim Group, a high-end real estate brokerage firm in the Orange County, California area (with offices in West Hollywood and Newport Beach), and follows a group of agents as they navigate their personal and professional lives. The first season premiered with eight episodes on August 24, 2022. The show was renewed for a second and third season on January 18, 2023.

Cast 
 Jason Oppenheim, co-founder of the Oppenheim Group.
 Alex Hall, started out with an interior design career before becoming a realtor.
 Alexandra Jarvis, she became a realtor after practicing business and employment law.
 Alexandra Rose, she was the first realtor in the OC office and is now their top producing agent.
 Brandi Marshall, before starting her 15-year career in real estate, Marshall worked as a Public Relations exec.
 Gio Helou, in addition to luxury real estate, he works in property development and produced a documentary film.
 Kayla Carmona, started her career in real estate with one of the top teams on Zillow in Orange County, where she won an award a few months into her career.
 Lauren Shortt,  a Southern California native who owned a small business in the LA suburbs before moving to the OC.
 Polly Brindle, British-born Polly is a former model who worked in Europe for over two decades.
 Sean Palmieri, started his real estate career in South Florida, where he grew up, before moving to California in 2018.
 Austin Victoria, a model and father of twin girls who became a realtor in 2017.
 Tyler Stanaland, fifth-generation realtor Stanaland got his license at 18 and worked with his family business for 12 years before leaving to join the show.

Timeline of cast members

Episodes

Series overview

Season 1 (2022)

Production 
In November 2021, Selling the OC was announced as a second spin-off of the Netflix series Selling Sunset. Filming occurred between November (2021) and March 2022. 
In January 2023, Netflix renewed the series for a second and third season.

References

External links

2022 American television series debuts
2020s American reality television series
American television spin-offs
English-language Netflix original programming
Property buying television shows
Reality television spin-offs
Television shows set in Orange County, California
Television series by Lionsgate Television